Hulu Terengganu is a federal constituency in Kuala Nerus District and Hulu Terengganu District, Terengganu, Malaysia, that has been represented in the Dewan Rakyat since 1974.

The federal constituency was created in the 1974 redistribution and is mandated to return a single member to the Dewan Rakyat under the first past the post voting system.

Demographics

History

Polling districts 
According to the federal gazette issued on 31 October 2022, the Hulu Terenggnu constituency is divided into 52 polling districts.

Representation history

State constituency

Current state assembly members

Local governments

Election results

References

Terengganu federal constituencies